Thomas Michael McCarthy (born June 18, 1961) is a former middle relief pitcher in Major League Baseball who played from  through  for the Boston Red Sox (1985) and Chicago White Sox (1988–89). Listed at 6' 0", 180 lb., McCarthy batted and threw right-handed.

Career
In a three-season career, McCarthy posted a 3–2 record with a 3.61 ERA and one save in 40 appearances, including 20 games finished, 34 strikeouts, 26 walks, 88 hits allowed, and  innings of work.

Following his majors career, McCarthy pitched for Triple-A Richmond Braves (1992), Charlotte Knights (1993) and Albuquerque Dukes. In 106 appearances, he went 13–14 with a 4.13 ERA and six saves.

See also
Boston Red Sox all-time roster
Chicago White Sox all-time roster

External links

1961 births
Living people
Albuquerque Dukes players
American expatriate baseball players in Canada
American expatriate baseball players in Mexico
American expatriates in West Germany
Boston Red Sox players
Charlotte Knights players
Chicago White Sox players
Diablos Rojos del México players
Elmira Pioneers players
Jackson Mets players
Major League Baseball pitchers
Major League Baseball players from Germany
Mexican League baseball pitchers
New Britain Red Sox players
Pawtucket Red Sox players
People from Landstuhl
Pericos de Puebla players
Richmond Braves players
Tiburones de La Guaira players
American expatriate baseball players in Venezuela
Tidewater Tides players
Vancouver Canadians players
Winston-Salem Spirits players
Sportspeople from Rhineland-Palatinate